George Rhodes may refer to:

 George M. Rhodes (1898–1978), Democratic member of the U.S. House of Representatives from Pennsylvania
 George Rhodes (cricketer) (born 1993), English cricketer
 George Rhodes (farmer) (1816–1864), New Zealand pastoralist
 George Rhodes (musician) (1918–1985), African American arranger, conductor and composer